The 2017 SummerSlam was the 30th annual SummerSlam professional wrestling pay-per-view (PPV) and livestreaming event produced by WWE. It was held for wrestlers from the promotion's Raw and SmackDown brand divisions. The event took place on August 20, 2017, at Barclays Center in Brooklyn, New York for the third consecutive year.

Thirteen matches were contested at the event, including three on the Kickoff pre-show. The event featured eight championship matches, the most for a SummerSlam event, where five of the titles changed hands. In the main event, Brock Lesnar defeated Braun Strowman, Roman Reigns, and Samoa Joe in a fatal four-way match to retain Raw's Universal Championship and in the penultimate match, Jinder Mahal defeated Shinsuke Nakamura to retain SmackDown's WWE Championship. In other prominent matches, AJ Styles defeated Kevin Owens to retain SmackDown's United States Championship in a match that featured Shane McMahon as the special guest referee, Dean Ambrose and Seth Rollins defeated Cesaro and Sheamus to win the Raw Tag Team Championship, and Sasha Banks defeated Alexa Bliss to win her record-tying fourth Raw Women's Championship.

Production

Background

SummerSlam is an annual pay-per-view (PPV) and WWE Network event produced every summer by WWE since 1988. Dubbed "The Biggest Party of the Summer," it is one of the promotion's original four pay-per-views, along with WrestleMania, SummerSlam, and Survivor Series, referred to as the "Big Four". It has since become considered WWE's second biggest event of the year behind WrestleMania. The 2017 event was the 30th SummerSlam and was scheduled to be held on August 20, 2017, at the Barclays Center in Brooklyn, New York for the third consecutive year. It featured wrestlers from the Raw and SmackDown brand divisions.

Storylines
The event compromised thirteen matches, including three on the Kickoff pre-show, that resulted from scripted storylines, where wrestlers portrayed heroes, villains, or less distinguishable characters in scripted events that built tension and culminated in a wrestling match or series of matches. Results were predetermined by WWE's writers on the Raw and SmackDown brands, while storylines were produced on WWE's weekly television shows, Monday Night Raw, SmackDown Live, and the cruiserweight-exclusive 205 Live.

On the June 19 episode of Raw, Roman Reigns proclaimed himself to be the number one contender for the Universal Championship at SummerSlam. Later that night, Braun Strowman returned and cost Reigns his match against Samoa Joe and challenged Reigns to an ambulance match at Great Balls of Fire. At the event, Strowman defeated Reigns, but Reigns retaliated by locking Strowman in the ambulance and crashing it, leaving him bloodied and injured, while Brock Lesnar defeated Joe to retain the Universal Championship. The following night on Raw, as Raw General Manager Kurt Angle was about to reveal his plans for Lesnar's championship match at SummerSlam, Reigns interrupted, wanting the match. Joe then came out, wanting a rematch. Reigns and Joe were then scheduled for a number one contender match. During the match, Strowman returned and attacked both Reigns and Joe, resulting in a no contest. It was then decided that Lesnar would defend the title against Reigns, Joe and Strowman in a fatal four-way match at SummerSlam. The following week, Heyman proclaimed that if Lesnar were to lose the Universal Championship at SummerSlam, then he and Lesnar would leave the WWE.

At Battleground, Natalya won a fatal five-way elimination match to become the number one contender for Naomi's SmackDown Women's Championship at SummerSlam.

At Great Balls of Fire, Sasha Banks defeated Alexa Bliss by count-out, thus Bliss retained the Raw Women's Championship. Over the next couple of weeks, Bayley scored pins over Bliss in a tag team match, and a non-title singles match. Bayley in turn felt she deserved a title shot, while Banks felt she deserved a rematch due to Bliss' actions at Great Balls of Fire. A number one contender's match between the two the following week was won by Bayley. Bayley then suffered a legitimate shoulder injury, incurred during a match with Nia Jax, forcing her to relinquish her number one contender's spot. Two triple threat matches were then scheduled for the following episode of Raw with the winner of each facing each other to determine the new number one contender for the Raw Women's Championship. Banks won the first triple threat match by defeating Alicia Fox and Emma, while Jax won the second by defeating Dana Brooke and Mickie James. The following week, Banks defeated Jax to become the new number one contender against Bliss at SummerSlam.

At Battleground, Jinder Mahal defeated Randy Orton in a Punjabi Prison match to retain the WWE Championship with help from The Singh Brothers and the return of The Great Khali. On the following episode of SmackDown, Mahal demanded a new opponent for SummerSlam. John Cena came out, congratulated Mahal, and then challenged him for the WWE Championship at SummerSlam. However, SmackDown General Manager Daniel Bryan said Cena had to earn his opportunity and scheduled a number one contender's match between Cena and Shinsuke Nakamura. The following week, Nakamura defeated Cena to become the number one contender for the WWE Championship at SummerSlam.

On the Great Balls of Fire Kickoff pre-show, Neville defeated Akira Tozawa to retain the WWE Cruiserweight Championship. On the July 31 episode of Raw, a number one contender's match was scheduled between Tozawa and Ariya Daivari for the following night's 205 Live with the winner facing Neville for the Cruiserweight Championship at SummerSlam. On 205 Live, Tozawa defeated Daivari to become the number one contender. On the August 14 episode of Raw, Tozawa received his title match early and defeated Neville to become the new Cruiserweight Champion, and their originally scheduled SummerSlam match was made a rematch with Neville as the challenger. On August 16, WWE confirmed that the match would take place on the SummerSlam Kickoff pre-show.

At Battleground, Kevin Owens defeated AJ Styles to win his third United States Championship. On the following episode of SmackDown, Styles wanted to invoke his championship rematch, but he was interrupted by the returning Chris Jericho, who also wanted to invoke his rematch from when he lost the title to Owens back in May. As both Styles and Jericho were contractually owed rematches, SmackDown Commissioner Shane McMahon decided that they would both get their rematches for the title in a triple threat match that night against Owens, where Styles pinned Jericho to regain the title. After the match, Owens invoked his championship rematch for the following week. During the rematch that episode, Owens attacked the referee, but lost even though both shoulders were not on the mat. A frustrated Owens confronted Shane and SmackDown General Manager Daniel Bryan and demanded a rematch, but with a competent referee. Bryan scheduled the rematch for SummerSlam and made Shane the special guest referee.

On the August 1 episode of SmackDown, Rusev issued a SummerSlam "Open Challenge" to any wrestler on the SmackDown roster. Randy Orton, who Rusev had never defeated, accepted the challenge before attacking Rusev with an RKO.

At Battleground, The New Day (Kofi Kingston and Xavier Woods, with Big E) defeated The Usos (Jey Uso and Jimmy Uso) to win the SmackDown Tag Team Championship. On the following episode of SmackDown, as The New Day were about to make their entrance to celebrate their championship win, they were attacked by The Usos. The following week, The Usos proclaimed that they would reclaim the titles from The New Day, and a rematch was scheduled for SummerSlam. On the final SmackDown before SummerSlam, SmackDown General Manager Daniel Bryan confirmed that The Usos would be facing Big E and Woods with Kingston in their corner. On August 16, WWE confirmed that the match would take place on the SummerSlam Kickoff pre-show.

At Great Balls of Fire, Big Cass defeated Enzo Amore. Amore and Cass then had a rematch on the July 24 episode of Raw that Cass again won. Cass continued to attack Amore after the match, after which, Big Show came out for the save, but Cass also laid him out. The following week, Cass defeated Big Show by disqualification after Amore attacked Cass during the match. After Cass gave a big boot to Amore, Big Show performed the KO Punch on Cass. On the August 7 episode, Luke Gallows and Karl Anderson defeated Amore and Big Show after a distraction from Cass, and a brawl broke out between the three. Later, Cass confronted Raw General Manager Kurt Angle, wanting a match against Big Show at SummerSlam, but with Amore banned from the entire state of New York. Angle suggested to suspend Amore above the ring inside of a shark cage. Cass agreed and the match was scheduled for SummerSlam.

On the July 17 episode of Raw, as Finn Bálor was making his way to the backstage after his match with Elias, Bray Wyatt appeared on the TitanTron. He said that he enjoyed Bálor's pain and that he was Bálor's worst nightmare. The following week, Wyatt cost Bálor his no disqualification match against Elias by giving Bálor the Sister Abigail. On the July 31 episode, as Wyatt cut an in-ring promo, the lights started blinking red and then went out. When they came back on, Bálor appeared in the ring and attacked Wyatt. The following week, as Bálor cut a promo about Wyatt, the lights in the arena went out and Wyatt appeared in the center of the ring. He and Bálor fought briefly before the lights went out again and Wyatt appeared on the TitanTron laughing at Bálor. Afterwards, it was announced that a match between Bálor and Wyatt was scheduled for SummerSlam. The following week, after a confrontation earlier in the night, Raw General Manager Kurt Angle moved their SummerSlam match up to that night where Wyatt defeated Bálor. After the match, Wyatt poured a blood-like liquid on Bálor. A rematch between the two was scheduled for SummerSlam where Bálor promised to bring his Demon King persona.

On the July 25 episode of SmackDown, Shinsuke Nakamura defeated Mr. Money in the Bank Baron Corbin. After the August 1 episode of SmackDown, on the WWE Network, Corbin attacked Nakamura from behind after Nakamura's match with John Cena to determine the number one contender for Jinder Mahal's WWE Championship at SummerSlam, which Nakamura won. Cena came to Nakamura's aid and performed an Attitude Adjustment on Corbin through the announcers table. The following week, SmackDown General Manager Daniel Bryan scheduled a match between Corbin and Cena at SummerSlam. On the final SmackDown before SummerSlam, Corbin attacked Cena during the latter's non-title match against Mahal, causing a disqualification. Afterwards, Corbin cashed in his Money in the Bank contract, but when the match started, he attacked Cena, who was on the apron, allowing Mahal to roll-up Corbin for the victory.

Throughout July and August 2017, Dean Ambrose and Seth Rollins teased a potential and partial Shield reunion for several weeks with both men sticking their fists out for the other for The Shield's signature fist bump, but both would decline each week, primarily due to trust issues from Rollins' betrayal three years prior. On the July 31 episode of Raw, Rollins was confronted by Cesaro and Sheamus and later won a match against Sheamus. After the match, Cesaro and Sheamus attacked Rollins before Ambrose came down to make the save. Backstage, Ambrose told Rollins that he would not help him if Rollins got outnumbered again. The following week, after Rollins lost a rematch against Sheamus and was once again attacked after the match, Ambrose did not help him. Later that night, Ambrose defeated Cesaro and was subsequently attacked by the duo before being saved by Rollins. Ambrose then displayed signs of trust by offering the Shield fist bump, but Rollins ultimately declined. Finally, on the August 14 episode of Raw, although both Ambrose and Rollins got into a physical altercation earlier in the night, the two came together to fight off Cesaro and Sheamus and both reciprocated the fist bump and reunited. Immediately afterwards, Raw General Manager Kurt Angle came out and scheduled a match between Cesaro and Sheamus and Ambrose and Rollins for the Raw Tag Team Championship at SummerSlam.

On the May 29 episode of Raw, Raw commentator Corey Graves received a text message concerning Raw General Manager Kurt Angle and Angle said that the contents of the message could ruin him. Over the next few weeks, both Angle and Graves received the same text messages concerning this private matter. On the July 10 episode of Raw, Graves confronted Angle about what he was going to do. Angle said that he would go public with it the following week and that he might lose his family, his career could be destroyed, and he might be saying goodbye to the WWE Universe. Graves was confident that Angle would be fine due to the love and respect from the WWE Universe and everyone in the locker room. Later on the phone, Angle invited an unidentifiable person to come to Raw next week to discuss the matter and go public with it together. That episode, Angle revealed American Alpha's Jason Jordan as his (kayfabe) illegitimate son, and the newest member of the Raw brand, which subsequently disbanded American Alpha. The following week, Jordan defeated Curt Hawkins in his Raw debut match. Jordan was then the guest on "Miz TV". Intercontinental Champion The Miz offered Jordan a chance to join his Miztourage, but Jordan declined and Miz retaliated by stating that Jordan does not need his help since his father is the Raw General Manager. Jordan said that he did not want preferential treatment, and The Miz made some irritable comments about Angle. The Miz then took a swing at Jordan, but Jordan ducked and suplexed Miz into his Miztourage (Curtis Axel and Bo Dallas). On the August 14 episode of Raw, Jordan defeated The Miz by disqualification after the Miztourage attacked Jordan; The Hardy Boyz (Jeff Hardy and Matt Hardy) then ran out to even the odds by assisting Jordan in fending off the Miztourage. This led to a six-man tag team match later that night between The Miz and The Miztourage against The Hardy Boyz and Jordan, where the latter won. On August 17, WWE announced that The Miz and The Miztourage would be facing The Hardy Boyz and Jordan in a rematch on the SummerSlam Kickoff pre-show.

Event

Pre-show 
Three matches were contested on the SummerSlam Kickoff pre-show. In the first match, The Hardy Boyz (Jeff Hardy and Matt Hardy) and Jason Jordan faced Intercontinental Champion The Miz and The Miztourage (Curtis Axel and Bo Dallas). The Miz performed a "Skull Crushing Finale" on Jordan to win the match for his team.

After that, Akira Tozawa defended the WWE Cruiserweight Championship against Neville. Neville performed a "Red Arrow" on Tozawa to win his record second Cruiserweight Championship.

Finally, The New Day (Big E and Xavier Woods) defended the SmackDown Tag Team Championship against The Usos (Jey Uso and Jimmy Uso). Jey and Jimmy performed a double Samoan Splash on Big E to win the titles for a record-setting second time.

Preliminary matches 
The actual pay-per-view opened with John Cena facing Baron Corbin. The entire match only featured one finisher, with Cena performing an "Attitude Adjustment" on Corbin to win the match.

Next, Naomi defended the SmackDown Women's Championship against Natalya. In the climax, as Naomi attempted a split-legged moonsault, Natalya raised her knees to counter. Natalya forced Naomi to submit to the Sharpshooter to win her first championship since 2010, as well as becoming the first wrestler to win the WWE Divas Championship and SmackDown Women's Championship.

After that, Big Cass faced Big Show, with Enzo Amore suspended above the ring inside a shark cage. Big Show performed a "KO Punch" on Cass for a near-fall. Big Show performed a chokeslam on Cass for another near-fall. Amore stripped to his underwear and applied oil on himself to escape the cage. As Amore escaped the cage, Cass performed a big boot on Amore. Cass then performed a big boot on Big Show for a near-fall. Cass performed a second big boot and an "Empire Elbow" on Big Show to win the match.

In the fourth match, Randy Orton faced Rusev. During Orton's entrance, Rusev attacked Orton. After the referee ruled Orton could compete, the match began. Orton quickly performed an "RKO" on Rusev to win in ten seconds.

After that, Alexa Bliss defended the Raw Women's Championship against Sasha Banks. Bliss dominated most of the match. Banks countered a DDT attempt by Bliss and applied the "Bank Statement", however, Bliss reached the ropes to void the submission. Bliss then pulled the ring apron, causing Banks to tumble out of the ring and injure her shoulder. Banks made it back to the ring before the ten-count, but Bliss went right back to the injured shoulder and followed up with "Twisted Bliss" on Banks for a nearfall. As Bliss attempted a DDT again, Banks countered into a "Bank Statement". Bliss countered it into a roll-up, but Banks kicked out and re-applied the hold to force Bliss to submit and win the title for a record-tying fourth time.

In the sixth match, "The Demon King" Finn Bálor faced Bray Wyatt. Bálor performed a "Coup De Grâce" on Wyatt to win the match.

In the seventh match, Cesaro and Sheamus defended the Raw Tag Team Championship against Dean Ambrose and Seth Rollins. In the climax, as Sheamus and Cesaro attempted an assisted "White Noise" on Ambrose, Rollins performed a super hurricanrana on Cesaro into Sheamus. Rollins then performed superkicks on Cesaro and Sheamus, and performed a "Ripcord Knee" on Sheamus, which allowed Ambrose to perform "Dirty Deeds" on Sheamus to win the titles. This marked Ambrose's first reign and Rollins' second reign, individually. Ambrose became the first Shield member to be a Grand Slam Champion.

Next, AJ Styles defended the United States Championship against Kevin Owens, with Shane McMahon serving as special guest referee. During the match, as Shane checked on Owens, Styles performed a springboard 450° splash on Shane, who Owens had pulled on top of him. Owens performed a pop-up powerbomb on Styles for a delayed near-fall. Owens then began to argue with Shane. Styles attempted a "Calf Crusher" but Owens countered by kicking Styles into Shane. Styles forced Owens to submit to the "Calf Crusher", however, Shane was knocked out, which led to Styles arguing with Shane. Styles performed a "Styles Clash" on Owens for a near-fall. Owens performed a pop-up powerbomb on Styles, but Shane noticed Styles' foot on the ring ropes, voiding the pinfall at a two count. An irate Owens and Shane argued, with Shane shoving Owens. Styles rolled up Owens for a near-fall. In the climax, Styles performed a "Pele Kick", a "Phenomenal Forearm", and a second "Styles Clash" on Owens to retain the title.

In the penultimate match, Jinder Mahal (accompanied by The Singh Brothers) defended the WWE Championship against Shinsuke Nakamura. In the end, The Singh Brothers interfered, leading to Nakamura performing "Kinshasas" on both the brothers. As Nakamura was distracted, Mahal took advantage and performed the "Khallas" on Nakamura to retain the title.

Main event 
In the main event, Brock Lesnar (with Paul Heyman) defended the WWE Universal Championship against Roman Reigns, Samoa Joe, and Braun Strowman in a fatal four-way match, with the stipulation that should Lesnar lose the title, he and Heyman would leave WWE. Early outside the ring, Joe applied the Coquina Clutch on Lesnar and Reigns performed a Spear on Lesnar through the barricade in the timekeeper's area after Joe dodged Reigns. Joe performed a Side Slam on Reigns on an announce table. Strowman performed a Running Powerslam on Lesnar through an announce table and threw a commentator's chair at Reigns and Joe. Strowman performed a second Running Powerslam on Lesnar through another announce table and overturned the last one available on Lesnar. Medical personnel arrived and took Lesnar away. The match continued as a Triple Threat briefly. Strowman attacked Joe and Reigns with steel steps, but later, Reigns attacked Strowman with the same steel steps, taking him out of the ring and cutting his head. As Joe countered a Superman Punch into a Coquina Clutch on Reigns, Strowman broke the hold. Strowman performed a Double Chokeslam on Reigns and Joe, scoring a nearfall on Reigns. An angry Lesnar returned and performed a double-leg takedown on Strowman. Lesnar then punched him repeatedly and clotheslined him out of the ring. Then, Lesnar attacked Reigns and Joe with German Suplexes. Strowman returned, but Lesnar applied a kimura lock on him. However, Reigns performed superman punches on Lesnar, Strowman and Joe. Reigns performed another Spear on Lesnar for a nearfall. As Joe applied the Coquina Clutch on Reigns, Strowman performed a Running Front Dropkick on Reigns into Joe. Strowman performed a Running Powerslam on Joe only for Lesnar to pull the referee out of the ring voiding the pinfall at a two count. As Strowman performed a Running Powerslam on Reigns, Lesnar voided the pinfall at a two count. Reigns performed a Spear on Strowman who fell to the floor. Joe applied the Coquina Clutch on Lesnar only for Lesnar to counter into an F-5 with Reigns voiding the pinfall at a two count. In the climax, Reigns performed three more Superman Punches on Lesnar and attempted a third Spear, however, Lesnar countered into an F-5 on Reigns to retain the title.

Aftermath

Raw 
On the following episode of Raw, Brock Lesnar and Paul Heyman came out to celebrate Lesnar retaining the Universal Championship. They were then interrupted by Braun Strowman, who attacked Lesnar with two Running Powerslams. Later, it was announced that Lesnar would defend the Universal Championship against Strowman at No Mercy. Later in the show, John Cena moved over to the Raw brand and was interrupted by Roman Reigns, and then The Miz and Samoa Joe. Cena and Reigns later teamed up and defeated Joe and Miz. The following week, Cena and Reigns were scheduled to face each other at No Mercy.

Also on Raw, Jason Jordan wanted to face Finn Bálor. Raw General Manager Kurt Angle scheduled the match in which Bálor won. Both then participated in a battle royal to determine the number one contender for the Intercontinental Championship where Bray Wyatt caused Bálor's elimination, setting up a rematch for No Mercy.

Dean Ambrose and Seth Rollins came out to celebrate becoming the new Raw Tag Team Champions. They were then interrupted by The Hardy Boyz, who congratulated them and challenged them to a non-title match that Ambrose and Rollins won. Cesaro and Sheamus were then granted their championship rematch at No Mercy.

Sasha Banks came out to celebrate with the Raw Women's Championship. Alexa Bliss interrupted and invoked her rematch for the following week, where she regained the title, also continuing Banks' streak of losing in title defenses. Nia Jax congratulated Bliss, but then turned on her. The following week, Jax teamed up with Emma and defeated Bliss and Banks to make the No Mercy match a fatal four-way also involving Jax and Emma. Bayley then returned to make it a fatal five-way.

SmackDown 
On the following episode of SmackDown, as retribution for The Singh Brothers costing Shinsuke Nakamura his WWE Championship match against Jinder Mahal, SmackDown General Manager Daniel Bryan scheduled Nakamura to face The Singh Brothers in a handicap match that Nakamura won. Afterwards, Mahal attacked Nakamura, but Nakamura countered with the Kinshasa. On the September 5 episode, Nakamura defeated Randy Orton to receive another chance at the WWE Championship at Hell in a Cell.

AJ Styles reinstated the U.S. Championship Open Challenge which was answered by Kevin Owens. Styles denied him since he beat Owens at SummerSlam, but Owens said that he was screwed by SmackDown Commissioner Shane McMahon. Shane came out and they reviewed scenes from the match. After a verbal confrontation, Styles agreed to the rematch and Shane allowed Owens to pick a special guest referee, but said this would be his last chance at the title. Owens picked Baron Corbin as the referee, but mid-match, Shane took over due to Corbin's poor performance and Styles retained. Owens, frustrated with Shane, began a feud with him, also involving Shane's father and WWE Chairman Mr. McMahon, where a Hell in a Cell match between Owens and Shane was scheduled for Hell in a Cell.

New SmackDown Tag Team Champions The Usos defeated The Hype Bros (Zack Ryder and Mojo Rawley), after which, they made a warning to the entire SmackDown tag team division. The following week, they faced The New Day in a match where the winner chose the stipulation for The New Day's championship rematch. The Usos won and chose to face The New Day in a Street Fight on the September 12 episode, where The New Day regained the titles. Another rematch was scheduled for Hell in a Cell in the titular match.

New SmackDown Women's Champion Natalya said that she would restore dignity to the title. She then teamed up with Carmella in a losing effort against Naomi and Becky Lynch. The following week, Naomi informed Natalya that she would be invoking her championship rematch for the September 12 episode, where Natalya retained.

Rusev had a rematch with Randy Orton on the September 19 episode of SmackDown where Rusev, with the help from Aiden English, defeated Orton in 10 seconds. Another rematch was scheduled for Hell in a Cell, which Orton won.

205 Live
On the following Raw, Big Cass faced Enzo Amore in a Brooklyn Street Fight, which Amore won as Cass suffered a legitimate leg injury during the match and could no longer compete. Amore was subsequently moved to the cruiserweight division on 205 Live.

On the following episode of 205 Live, Tozawa received his rematch for the WWE Cruiserweight Championship, but was unsuccessful.

Results

References

External links 

2017
2017 WWE Network events
Events in Brooklyn, New York
2017 in New York City
Professional wrestling in New York City
2017 WWE pay-per-view events
August 2017 events in the United States